John Brosius (born February 27, 1940) is an American sprint canoer who competed in the early 1970s. He was eliminated in the semifinals of the K-2 1000 m event at the 1972 Summer Olympics in Munich.

References
Sports-reference.com profile

1940 births
American male canoeists
Canoeists at the 1972 Summer Olympics
Living people
Olympic canoeists of the United States
Place of birth missing (living people)